Caccoleptus is a genus of beetles in the family Dermestidae, containing the following species:

 Caccoleptus anisotomoides Sharp, 1902
 Caccoleptus honeymani Beal, 1979
 Caccoleptus ornatus Háva, 2004
 Caccoleptus pectinis Háva, 2004
 Caccoleptus rotundus Sharp, 1902
 Caccoleptus wicki Beal, 1978

References

Dermestidae genera